Johannes Rudolphi (5 October 1877, Potsdam - 21 January 1950, Potsdam) was a German landscape painter in the Post-Impressionist style.

Life and work 
His father, Wilhelm Rudolphi, was a doctor, and a descendant of the Westphalian painter, . In 1899, he enrolled at the Academy of Fine Arts, Munich, where he studied "painting from nature" with Gabriel von Hackl. After returning home, he attended the Prussian Academy of Arts. It was then that he decided to focus on landscapes. In 1901 he married the painter, daughter of the architect, . One of their sons, would also become a painter.

He completed his studies in 1902 and settled in Berlin. His summers were often spent in a small house near the Neuen Garten, from which he would go on painting excursions. He also made extended trips to the Uckermark, Küstrin and the Neumark. His first major showing was at the Große Berliner Kunstausstellung of 1905. He exhibited there until 1909, when he joined the Berlin Secession. The following year, he moved into a house with a studio near the Schlachtensee, where he lived and worked for the rest of his life. Most of his landscapes depict areas in Brandenburg. He was especially fond of the lowlands in Golm.

During World War I, he ventured out little and limited himself to pencil sketches. After the war, he went through what may have been his most significant creative phase, and his works were very popular; throughout the Weimar period and the Nazi regime. In the 1940s, his eyesight began to weaken, due to an unspecified eye disease, and his painting became sporadic.

References

Further reading
 "Rudolphi, Johannes", In: Allgemeines Lexikon der Bildenden Künstler von der Antike bis zur Gegenwart, Vol. 29: Rosa–Scheffauer, E. A. Seemann, Leipzig 1935

External links 

1877 births
1950 deaths
19th-century German painters
19th-century German male artists
German landscape painters
Academy of Fine Arts, Munich alumni
Prussian Academy of Arts alumni
People from Potsdam
20th-century German painters
20th-century German male artists